The 2017–18 Lebanese FA Cup was the 46th season of the national football competition of Lebanon. The competition started on 6 October 2017 and concluded with the final on 29 April 2018.

Defending champions Ansar lost to Nejmeh in the quarter-finals. Ahed went on to win their 5th title, qualifying for the 2019 AFC Cup group stage.

First round

Second round

Round of 16

Quarter-finals

Semi-finals

Final

References

External links
Soccerway

Lebanese FA Cup seasons
Lebanon
2017–18 in Lebanese football